Colin Meloy Sings Shirley Collins is the tour-only EP by Colin Meloy, lead singer of The Decemberists.  Similar to his EP from 2005, where he covered six songs by Morrissey of The Smiths, Meloy covers six traditional arrangements from folk singer Shirley Collins.

Track listing
"Dance to Your Daddy"
"Charlie"
"Barbara Allen"
"Cherry Tree Carol"
"Turpin Hero"
"I Drew My Ship"

Colin Meloy albums
2006 EPs
Covers EPs